Vávra Suk (born 18 March 1973 in Prague, Czechoslovakia) is a nationalist politician in Sweden. He was previously the party secretary of the National Democrats, a party which he co-founded in 2001 in a breakaway from the Sweden Democrats. He was the editor of the National Democrat's newspaper Nationell Idag until 2012. In late 2012, he became the editor of the newly founded Nya Tider.
He is the registered owner of the domain for Free West Media.

References 

1973 births
Living people
Politicians from Prague
Swedish politicians
Swedish newspaper editors
Swedish people of Czech descent
Swedish nationalists